The WN-3 was a Polish seven-cylinder air-cooled radial engine of the 1950s, produced by WSK-Kalisz, designed by Wiktor Narkiewicz.

Design and development

In 1946, Wiktor Narkiewicz, who prior to the Second World War was technical director of the Czechoslovakian Avia aero-engine factory, was appointed chief designer of the Polish Central Engine Office, and later the Aero-engine department of the Polish Aviation Institute (Instytut Lotnictwa, IL). He led the design of the WN-1, a  air-cooled flat-four piston engine which was the first post-war Polish aero-engine, followed by the  WN-2 in 1947, but both of these engines failed to enter production.

In 1952 Narkiewicz set up a small design team to design a new seven-cylinder radial engine, the WN-3. The WN-3 entered production in 1956, powering the PZL TS-8 Bies training aircraft.

The engine was produced in 1957-1960 by WSK-Kalisz in Kalisz, it might be known also as PZL WN-3, or (in Western sources) as Narkiewicz WN-3.

Variants
WN-3
Production version, .
WN-4
Modified version for use in helicopters.

Applications

PZL TS-8 Bies
PZL MD-12 (prototype)
BŻ-4 Żuk (prototype)

Specifications

References

 

1950s aircraft piston engines
Aircraft air-cooled radial piston engines